The 2017 Marylebone Cricket Club University Matches were a series of first-class cricket matches played between the eighteen County Championship teams and the six Marylebone Cricket Club University teams (MCCU) of England and Wales. Each county side played one fixture against a MCCU side ahead of the start of the 2017 County Championship. Following Leicestershire's match against Loughborough MCCU, bowler Charlie Shreck was found guilty of using obscene language or gestures. This was Leicestershire's fifth fixed penalty in 12 months, resulting in them being deducted 16 points for the 2017 County Championship season.

Fixtures

Round 1

Round 2

Round 3

References

External links
 Series home at ESPN Cricinfo

Marylebone Cricket Club University Matches
English domestic cricket competitions